Narcissus and Psyche is a 1980 Hungarian drama film directed by Gábor Bódy. It was adapted for the screen by Vilmos Csaplar from a Sándor Weöres novel. The film stars Patricia Adriani, Udo Kier, György Cserhalmi, János Derzsi, Miklós Erdély, János Pilinszky and other notable artists of the day. Art director, designer of this movie was Gábor Bachman. The soundtrack was partly composed, partly arranged and distorted from various classical scores by László Vidovszky.

References

External links

 

1980 films
Hungarian drama films
1980 drama films